Derek Christopher Mayer (born May 21, 1967) is a Canadian professional ice hockey coach and former professional ice hockey player. He played 17 games for the Ottawa Senators of the National Hockey League (NHL). He was also a member of the Canadian team at the 1994 Olympics. He played most of his professional playing career in Europe and currently is an assistant coach for Starbulls Rosenheim in Germany's third-tier Oberliga.

Playing career 
Drafted by the Detroit Red Wings in the 1986 NHL draft (43 overall), he graduated from the University of Denver in 1988 and the spent some time in the Canadian national team system. Mayer then signed with AHL's Adirondack Red Wings for the 1989-90 season, where he spent a total of three season, interrupted and followed by stints with the San Diego Gulls of the IHL (1990–91 and 1991–92).

Mayer made his NHL debut with the Ottawa Senators during the 1993-94 season. He played a total of 17 games in the NHL.

He played at the 1993 World Championships and won silver at the 1994 Olympic Games in Lillehammer, Norway, with the Canadian national team.

From 1996 to 2001, Mayer played for Eisbären Berlin in the German top-flight Deutsche Eishockey Liga, followed by four years at EC Bad Tölz in the German second division and one year at German Oberliga side SC Riessersee.

He retired in 2006.

Career statistics

Regular season and playoffs

International

Coaching career 
Mayer began his coaching career 2006 at Eisbären Berlin Juniors and signed on 24 June 2009 a contract as Assistant Coach of Nürnberg Ice Tigers. In June 2015, Mayer joined the coaching staff of EHC Red Bull München in Germany as an assistant.

References

External links

1967 births
Living people
Adirondack Red Wings players
Atlanta Knights players
EC Bad Tölz players
Canadian ice hockey defencemen
Denver Pioneers men's ice hockey players
Detroit Red Wings draft picks
Eisbären Berlin players
Ice hockey people from British Columbia
Ice hockey players at the 1994 Winter Olympics
Medalists at the 1994 Winter Olympics
Olympic ice hockey players of Canada
Olympic medalists in ice hockey
Olympic silver medalists for Canada
Ottawa Senators players
Penticton Knights players
People from Rossland, British Columbia
SC Riessersee players
San Diego Gulls (IHL) players
Tappara players